Rahmat Iqbal College also called Rahmat Iqbal Degree College is a private college in Bamihal, Natore in Bangladesh. It is situated by the Rajshahi-Bogra Highway. It offers secondary education to its local students.

Sources

External links
Government Site
Bangladesh Bureau of Educational Information and Statistics
 List of Colleges in the Natore District
 List of Non-Government Colleges
Rahmat Iqbal Degree College

Colleges in Natore District
Universities and colleges in Natore District